Julius Freeman (c. 1927 – July 22, 2016) was one of the Documented Original Tuskegee Airmen (DOTA).

Military
He was a medical technician with the Tuskegee Airmen.

Awards
Congressional Gold Medal awarded to the Tuskegee Airmen in 2006

Death
Freeman, died of a heart attack in Spring Garden, New York, on July 22, 2016.

See also
 Dogfights (TV series)
 Executive Order 9981
 List of Tuskegee Airmen
 Military history of African Americans
 The Tuskegee Airmen (movie)

References

Notes

Tuskegee Airmen
2016 deaths
United States Army Air Forces officers
Year of birth uncertain
African-American aviators
21st-century African-American people
1927 births
People from Lexington, Kentucky
Burials at Calverton National Cemetery